Pope Pius IV (31 March 1499 – 9 December 1565), born Giovanni Angelo Medici, was head of the Catholic Church and ruler of the Papal States from 25 December 1559 to his death in December 1565. Born in Milan, his family considered itself a branch of the House of Medici and used the same coat of arms. Although modern historians have found no proof of this connection, the Medici of Florence recognized the claims of the Medici of Milan in the early 16th century.

Pope Paul III appointed Medici Archbishop of Ragusa, and sent him on diplomatic missions to Germany and Hungary. He presided over the final session of the Council of Trent. His nephew, Cardinal Charles Borromeo, was a close adviser. As pope, Pius IV initiated a number of building projects in Rome, including one to improve the water supply.

Life

Early life
Giovanni Angelo Medici was born in Milan on 31 March 1499 as the second of eleven children to Bernardino Medici and Clelia Serbelloni.

Giovanni Medici was the younger brother of condottiero Gian Giacomo Medici, and the maternal uncle of Charles Borromeo. Medici studied philosophy and medicine in Pavia.

After studying at University of Bologna and acquiring a reputation as a jurist he obtained his doctorate in both canon and civil law on 11 May 1525. Medici went in 1527 to Rome, and as a favourite of Pope Paul III was rapidly promoted to the governorship of several towns, the archbishopric of Ragusa (1545–1553), and the vice-legateship of Bologna.

Cardinalate
On 8 April 1549, Pope Paul III made Medici a cardinal, receiving his red hat and titular church title on the following 10 May. Under Papal authority, he was sent on diplomatic missions to Germany and also to Hungary.

Pontificate

Election

On the death of Pope Paul IV, he was elected pope on 25 December 1559, taking the name Pius IV, and installed on 6 January 1560. His first public acts of importance were to grant a general pardon to the participants in the riot after the death of his predecessor, and to bring to trial the nephews of his predecessor. One, Cardinal Carlo Carafa, was strangled, and Duke Giovanni Carafa of Paliano, with his nearest associates, was beheaded.

Council of Trent

On 18 January 1562 the Council of Trent, which had been suspended by Pope Julius III, was convened by Pius IV for the third and final time. Great skill and caution were necessary to effect a settlement of the questions before it, inasmuch as the three principal nations taking part in it, though at issue with regard to their own special demands, were prepared to unite their forces against the demands of Rome. Pius IV, however, aided by Cardinal Morone and Charles Borromeo, proved himself equal to the emergency, and by judicious management – and concession – brought the council to a termination satisfactory to the disputants and favourable to the pontifical authority. Its definitions and decrees were confirmed by a papal bull ("Benedictus Deus") dated 26 January 1564; and, though they were received with certain limitations by France and Spain, the famous Creed of Pius IV, or Tridentine Creed, became an authoritative expression of the Catholic faith. The more marked manifestations of stringency during his pontificate appear to have been prompted rather than spontaneous, his personal character inclining him to moderation and ease.

Thus, a warning, issued in 1564, summoning Jeanne d'Albret, the Queen of Navarre, before the Inquisition on a charge of Calvinism, was withdrawn by him in deference to the indignant protest of Charles IX of France. In the same year he published a bull granting the use of the cup to the laity of Austria and Bohemia. One of his strongest passions appears to have been that of building, which somewhat strained his resources in contributing to the adornment of Rome (including the new Porta Pia and Via Pia, named after him, and the northern extension (Addizione) of the rione of Borgo), and in carrying on the work of restoration, erection, and fortification in various parts of the ecclesiastical states.

On the other hand, others bemoaned the austere Roman culture during his papacy; Giorgio Vasari in 1567 spoke of a time when "the grandeurs of this place reduced by stinginess of living, dullness of dress, and simplicity in so many things; Rome is fallen into much misery, and if it is true that Christ loved poverty and the City wishes to follow in his steps she will quickly become beggarly...".

Consistories

Pius IV created 46 cardinals in four consistories during his pontificate, and elevated three nephews to the cardinalate, including Carlo Borromeo. The pope also made Ugo Boncompagni, who would later be elected Pope Gregory XIII, a cardinal. In 1561, the pope nominated Daniele Matteo Alvise Barbaro as a cardinal "in pectore"; however, the nomination was never publicly revealed. In 1565, Pius IV offered the cardinalate to Jean Parisot de La Valetta, the grand master of the Order of Malta, in recognition for his defense of Malta against the Ottoman Empire; however, he declined the pope's invitation.

Conspiracy
A conspiracy against Pius IV, headed by Benedetto Accolti, cousin of cardinal Benedetto Accolti the Younger, was discovered and crushed in 1565.

Architectural achievements
During the reign of Pius IV, Michelangelo rebuilt the basilica of Santa Maria degli Angeli (in Diocletian's Baths) and the eponymous Villa Pia, now known as Casina Pio IV,  in the Vatican Gardens designed by Pirro Ligorio. It is now the headquarters of the Pontifical Academy of Sciences. He also assigned Michelangelo to build Porta Pia.

Pius IV also ordered public construction to improve the water supply of Rome.

Beatifications
During his papacy, Pius IV canonized no saints and only beatified one individual, Gundisalvus of Amarante, on 16 September 1561.

Death
Pius IV died on 9 December 1565 from complications following an infection in the urinary tract and a high fever. He was buried in Santa Maria degli Angeli on 4 January 1583 after his remains were initially housed at Saint Peter's Basilica. His successor was Pius V.

Pius IV suffered from many illnesses such as gout which restricted his mobility. Giacomo Soranzo remarked between May and August 1565 to the Venetian Senate about the pope's health, commenting that he possessed a great natural vigor.  However, gout impeded movement in his legs, shoulders, arms, and hands. Sorzano also mentioned that this meant that the pope, more often than not, needed to be carried in the sedia gestatoria to avoid walking. Pius IV also suffered from a major illness in 1564 from which he recovered.

However, the pope fell ill eight days before his death with a constant fever throughout the duration. Carlo Borromeo, who arrived in Rome during the evening on 8 December, was with the pope when he died alongside Saint Philip Neri.

See also
Cardinals created by Pius IV
House of Medici
List of popes from the Medici family

References

Further reading

Pastor, Ludwig, Freiherr von (1928). The History of the Popes from the close of the Middle Ages. Volume XV, Volume XVI (1928). London : Kegan Paul, Trench, Trübner & Co.
Pattenden, Miles (2013). Pius IV and the Fall of The Carafa: Nepotism and Papal Authority in Counter-Reformation Rome. Oxford: Oxford University Press 2013. 
 Robinson, Adam Patrick. "Morone, Pius IV and the Resumption of the Council, December 1559–March 1563." in The Career of Cardinal Giovanni Morone (1509-1580) (Routledge, 2016) pp. 125–150.
 Waterworth, James, ed. The Canons and Decrees of the Sacred and Œcumenical Council of Trent: Celebrated Under the Sovereign Pontiffs, Paul III, Julius III and Pius IV (C. Dolman, 1848) online.

Hinojosa, R. de (1889), Felipe II y el conclave de 1559, según los documentos originales, muchos inéditos. Madrid 1889.

External links

 
 
 Catholic Hierarchy, Pope Pius IV
 Cardinals of the Holy Roman Church, Cardinal Medici
 

 
Italian popes
Bishops of Cassano
Council of Trent
Clergy from Milan
1499 births
1565 deaths
Medici, Giovanni Angelo
Popes
16th-century popes
House of Medici